Tatiana Figueirêdo (born 29 June 1968) is a Brazilian gymnast. She competed in five events at the 1984 Summer Olympics.

References

1968 births
Living people
Brazilian female artistic gymnasts
Gymnasts at the 1984 Summer Olympics
Olympic gymnasts of Brazil
Pan American Games bronze medalists for Brazil
Pan American Games medalists in gymnastics
South American Games bronze medalists for Brazil
South American Games gold medalists for Brazil
South American Games medalists in gymnastics
Sportspeople from Rio de Janeiro (city)
Competitors at the 1983 Pan American Games
Medalists at the 1983 Pan American Games
21st-century Brazilian women
20th-century Brazilian women